Rabbi John Simon Levi  (born 1934) is an Australian Progressive rabbi and author. He was the rabbi at Melbourne's Temple Beth Israel for many years and was a founder of Melbourne's King David School.

Levi was created a Member of the Order of Australia (AM) in the 1981 Queen's Birthday Honours. In the 2021 Australia Day Honours, Levi was awarded the highest level of honour, the Companion of the Order of Australia (AC). He was given the award for "eminent service to Judaism through seminal roles with religious, community and historical organisations, to the advancement of interfaith understanding, tolerance and collaboration, and to education".

Levi became the first Australian born rabbi when he was ordained in 1960 and joined the staff of Temple Beth Israel. He was senior rabbi there from 1974 to 1997 when he became Rabbi Emeritus. He was named as Rabbi Emeritus of Temple Beth Israel in 1997 Doctor of Laws (honoris causa) of Monash University.

Levi helped found the Australian Council of Christians and Jews in 1985. He was also a vice president of the World Union for Progressive Judaism from 1974 to 1998.

Levi has deep family roots in Australia stretching back to the mid 1800s, which include Nathaniel Levi, the first state Jewish MP.

Bibliography
Levi has written about 20 books, including

References

20th-century Australian rabbis
21st-century Australian rabbis
Living people
Australian biographers
Clergy from Melbourne
Companions of the Order of Australia
Members of the Order of Australia
Recipients of the Centenary Medal
1934 births